The Jinan–Qingdao high-speed railway or Jiqing high-speed railway is a high-speed railway between Qingdao and Jinan, the two main cities of Shandong province. Qingdao and Jinan were already served by two double-track lines consisting of the high-speed Qingdao–Jinan Passenger Railway and the conventional Qingdao–Jinan Railway. The new railway is a part of the Qingdao–Yinchuan corridor, one of the 8+8 national high-speed rail gridline, and provides further relief to rail transport between Qingdao and Jinan. Planning was approved by the NDRC on June 10, 2014 with construction starting a year later. Tracklaying started in 2017 and the whole line was opened on 26 December 2018. The railway shortens travel times between Qingdao and Jinan to 1 hour. This is in contrast to the 2.5 hours needed on the Qingdao–Jinan Passenger Railway and 4 hours on the original conventional Qingdao–Jinan Railway.

Stations

See also
 Qingdao–Jinan Passenger Railway – a slower high-speed railway running alongside the Qingdao–Jinan Railway.

References

High-speed railway lines in China
Rail transport in Shandong
Railway lines opened in 2018